Russell Investments Center is a 42-floor skyscraper in Seattle, Washington, United States.
 
The skyscraper was originally named WaMu Center because it was built to become the new headquarters for Washington Mutual (WaMu), which intended to move most of its many Seattle-area workers into one tower, streamline operations, and encourage worker interaction, with a reinvention of the workplace. Major construction ended in early 2006, with minor construction continuing into the fall. Tenants from Washington Mutual began to move into the tower in March that year. On September 25, 2008, Washington Mutual failed, and its assets and accounts were sold to JPMorgan Chase by the Federal Deposit Insurance Corporation. On June 1, 2009, the building was renamed Chase Center.  On September 9, 2009, the building was purchased by Northwestern Mutual of Milwaukee. Russell Investments, a Northwestern Mutual subsidiary, made the building its corporate headquarters upon relocation from Tacoma, Washington, and renamed the building the Russell Investments Center. 

The architect for the tower was NBBJ, which also designed nearby Two Union Square and other notable buildings in downtown Seattle. Sellen Construction was the general contractor for the project.  The tower is located at 1301 Second Avenue, on the opposite corner from 1201 Third Avenue that was previously named Washington Mutual Tower. It includes the Seattle Art Museum (SAM) on the first four floors of the west half of the building, and connects to the museum's existing building on the southern portion of the block. WaMu and SAM made an agreement where the museum may expand in two-floor increments up to the 12th floor over the next 20 years as needed. The building also features a private  rooftop patio on the west half of the 17th floor for workers of the tower to take walks along the several walking paths.

Tenants
Russell Investments (HQ)
Seattle Art Museum
Nordstrom
Oracle
Zillow (HQ)
Indeed, Inc.
JP Morgan Chase & Co.

References

External links

Russell Investments Center official website

Office buildings completed in 2006
NBBJ buildings
Skyscraper office buildings in Seattle